Dashbalbar is a sum (district) of Dornod Province in eastern Mongolia. The population of the sum in 2009 was 3,246, including 1,461 in the sum center. The sum covers 8,713 km² with a population density of 0.37 people/km².

Climate

Dashbalbar has a subarctic climate (Köppen climate classification Dwc) with warm summers and severely cold winters. Most precipitation falls in the summer as rain, with some snow in the spring and autumn. Winters are very dry.

References

Districts of Dornod Province